South–South cooperation (SSC) is a term historically used by policymakers and academics to describe the exchange of resources, technology, and knowledge between developing countries, also known as countries of the Global South. The Global South is making increasingly significant contributions to global development. The economic and geopolitical relevance of many countries has grown. In the past, south-south cooperation focused on sharing knowledge and building capacities, but the countries of the Global South and new financial institutions have recently also become increasingly active in development finance.

History
The formation of SSC can be traced to the Asian–African Conference that took place in Bandung, Indonesia, in 1955 which is also known as the Bandung Conference. The conference has been largely regarded as a milestone for SSC. Indonesia's president at that time, Sukarno, referred to it as "the first intercontinental conference of coloured peoples in the history of mankind." Despite Sukarno's opening address about the conference, there had been gatherings similar to the Bandung conference in the past. Nevertheless the Bandung Conference was distinctive and facilitated the formation of SSC because it was the first time that the countries in attendance were no longer colonies of distant European powers. President Sukarno also famously remarked at the conference that "Now we are free, sovereign, and independent. We are again masters in our own house. We do not need to go to other continents to confer."

The conference was sponsored by Burma, Ceylon, India, Indonesia, and Pakistan, and was attended by these 29 independent countries: Afghanistan, Burma, Cambodia, Ceylon, China, Egypt, Ethiopia, Gold Coast, India, Indonesia, Iran, Iraq, Japan, Jordan, Laos, Lebanon, Liberia, Libya, Nepal, Pakistan, the Philippines, Saudi Arabia, the Sudan, Syria, Thailand, Turkey, the Democratic Republic of Vietnam, the State of Vietnam, and the Kingdom of Yemen. Each country supported the continuation of decolonization efforts happening in both Africa and Asia at the time. Although many countries disagreed on some issues, the Bandung Conference "provided the first major instance of the post-colonial countries' collective resistance to Western Dominance in International relations."

In 1978, the United Nations established the Unit for South–South Cooperation to promote South–South trade and collaboration within its agencies.

However, the idea of South–South cooperation only started to influence the field of development in the late 1990s. Due to the geographical spectrum, activities are known as Africa–South America (ASA) cooperation as well as, in the Asia-Pacific region, South–South cooperation.

The ASA cooperation has so far held two summits. The first summit was held in Abuja, Nigeria, in 2006 where 53 delegates from Africa and 12 from South America attended. The second and most recent one was held on the Margarita Island in Venezuela in September 2009 where 49 heads of states from Africa and 12 heads of states from South America attended.

South–South cooperation has been successful in decreasing dependence on the aid programs of developed countries and in creating a shift in the international balance of power.

Direction
The Leaders of South American and African countries hope that this cooperation will bring a new world order and counter the existing Western dominance socially, economically and politically. Late president Hugo Chávez saw the formation of this cooperation as the "beginning of the salvation of [the] people," and as a major anti-imperialism movement. Like President Hugo Chávez, the ex-Libyan Leader Muammar al-Gaddafi was also very critical of the Western dominance of the "third world" nations.

Economic alliance

One of the key goals of the cooperation is to strengthen and improve economic ties. Some of the areas which these "southern" nations look forward to improving further include joint investment in energy and oil, and a common bank. Among other regional trade agreements which were reached during the 2009 summit was Venezuela signing an oil agreement with South Africa and a memorandum of understanding with Sierra Leone to form a joint mining company. Meanwhile, Brazil has developed an increasingly successful model of overseas aid provision of over $1 billion annually (ahead of many traditional donors), which focuses on technical expertise and the transfer of knowledge and expertise. Most of Brazilian aid is allocated to Africa, specifically to Portuguese-speaking African countries, and Latin America. Brazil's form of South–South development aid has been called a 'global model in waiting'.

The two continents have over one quarter of the world's energy resources. This includes the oil and natural gas reserves in Bolivia, Brazil, Ecuador, Venezuela, Algeria, Angola, Libya, Nigeria, Chad, Gabon and Equatorial Guinea.

In recent years, the South–South cooperation has recognized the importance of effective financial inclusion policy in order to better deliver appropriate financial services to the poor. Because of this, financial policy makers from nearly 100 developing and emerging countries now comprise a global knowledge-sharing network called the Alliance for Financial Inclusion (AFI).

Representatives from the developing south meet annually at the Global Policy Forum (GPF), making it the most important and comprehensive forum for regulatory institutions from emerging economies with an interest in promoting financial inclusion policy. The forum is focused on developing and improving national financial inclusion strategies and policies, and is used as a platform for senior financial regulators to exchange ideas and engage in peer-to-peer learning activities.

Banks to finance infrastructure projects 
One challenge for South–South cooperation has been the lack of sufficient capital to start a South–South bank as an alternative to the IMF and the World Bank. This has changed with the launch of two new 'South–South banks'.
At the sixth summit of the BRICS countries (Brazil, Russian Federation, India, China and South Africa), in July 2014, the five partners approved the establishment of the New Development Bank (or BRICS Development Bank), with a primary focus on lending for infrastructure projects. It will be based in Shanghai. A Contingency Reserve Agreement (CRA) has been concluded in parallel to provide the BRICS countries with alternatives to the World Bank and International Monetary Fund in times of economic hardship, protect their national economies and strengthen their global position. The Russian Federation is contributing US$18 billion to the CRA, which will be credited by the five partners with a total of over US$100 billion. The CRA is now operational. In 2015 and 2016, work was under way to develop financing mechanisms for innovative projects with the new bank’s resources.

The second new bank is the Asian Infrastructure Investment Bank. It has also been set up to finance infrastructure projects. Spearheaded by China, the bank is based in Beijing. By 2016, more than 50 countries had expressed interest in joining, including a number of developed countries: France, Germany, the Republic of Korea, United Kingdom, etc.

Asia–Pacific Free Trade Area 
China is spearheading the creation of an Asia–Pacific Free Trade Area, which, according to China’s vision, would override existing bilateral and multilateral free trade agreements in the region. The Asia-Pacific Economic Cooperation summit in November 2014 endorsed the Beijing Roadmap for completing a feasibility study by late 2016.

Special economic zones 
China's overseas SEZs are another example of South-South cooperation. From 1990 to 2018, Chinese enterprises established eleven SEZs in sub-Saharan Africa and the Middle East including: Nigeria (two), Zambia, Djibouti, Kenya, Mauritius, Mauritania, Egypt,  Oman, and Algeria. Generally, the Chinese government takes a hands-off approach, leaving it to Chinese enterprises to work to establish such zones (although it does provide support in the form of grants, loans,  and subsidies, including support via the China Africa Development Fund). The Forum on China-Africa Cooperation promotes these SEZs heavily.As Professor Dawn C. Murphy summarizes, these zones "aim to transfer China's development successes to other countries, increase business opportunities for China manufacturing companies, avoid trade barriers by setting up zones in countries with preferential trade access to important markets, and create a positive business environment for Chinese small and medium-sized enterprises investing in these regions."

South-South cooperation in agriculture 
In light of its ideological commitment to South-South Cooperation (and motivated by a pragmatic desire to increase food security) China has established a series of Agricultural Technology Demonstration Centers in Africa. These are a highly visible component agricultural cooperation between China African countries. The function of these centers is to transmit agricultural expertise and technology from China to developing countries in Africa while also creating market opportunities for Chinese companies in the agricultural sector. 

China first announced its Agricultural Technology Demonstrations Centers at the 2006 meeting of the Forum on China-Africa Cooperation. It launched 19 of these centers between 2006 and 2018, all in sub-Saharan Africa.

South-South cooperation in science

Role of regional economic communities 
Countries of the South are developing cooperation through regional economic communities. For example, the Russian Federation is developing co-operation with Asian partners within the Shanghai Cooperation Organisation and the Eurasian Economic Union. The latter was launched on 1 January 2015 with Belarus and Kazakhstan and has since been extended to Armenia and Kyrgyzstan. The Eurasian Economic Union replaces the Eurasian Economic Community.  In July 2015, the Russian Federation hosted a summit of the Shanghai Cooperation Organisation in the same city, at which the admission of India and Pakistan was announced.

Regional economic communities have become a conduit for South–South cooperation in science, technology and innovation. For example, Iran’s Nanotechnology Initiative Council established an Econano network in 2008 to promote the scientific and industrial development of nanotechnology among fellow members of the Economic Cooperation Organization, namely Afghanistan, Azerbaijan, Kazakhstan, Kyrgyzstan, Pakistan, Tajikistan, Turkey, Turkmenistan and Uzbekistan.

Other cooperation South-South cooperation organizations include the China Arab States Cooperation Forum and the Forum on China-Africa Cooperation (the latter has a significant political collaboration component, in addition to economic cooperation).

Bilateral collaboration 
Countries are also co-operating in science, technology and innovation on a bilateral basis to develop infrastructure and diversify the economy.  There is ‘dynamic bilateral collaboration’ between China and the Russian Federation, for instance. This cooperation stems from the Treaty on Good Neighbourliness, Friendship and Co-operation signed by the two countries in 2001, which has given rise to regular four-year plans for its implementation. Dozens of joint large-scale projects are being carried out. They concern the construction of the first super-high-voltage electricity transmission line in China; the development of an experimental fast neutron reactor; geological prospecting in the Russian Federation and China; and joint research in optics, metal processing, hydraulics, aerodynamics and solid fuel cells. Other priority areas for co-operation include industrial and medical lasers, computer technology, energy, the environment and chemistry, geochemistry, catalytic processes and new materials.

Role of regional centres
Increasingly, countries of the South are fostering cooperation in science and technology through regional or international centres. Africa has considerably expanded its networks of centres of excellence since the turn of the century. Most of these networks focus on biosciences but there is also a network in the field of mathematical sciences. Examples are the Bio-Innovate network based in Kenya, which focuses on improving agricultural techniques and developing agro-processing, and the African Biosafety Network of Expertise based in Burkina Faso, which helps regulators deal with safety issues related to the introduction and development of genetically modified organisms. These networks have an Achilles tendon, in that they tend to be reliant on donor funding for their survival.

Many regional and international centres have been set up under the auspices of United Nations agencies. One example is the International Science, Technology and Innovation Centre for South–South Cooperation (ISTIC) in Malaysia. It was established in 2008 under the auspices of UNESCO. In 2014, the Caribbean network of scientists, Cariscience, ran a training workshop in Tobago on Technopreneurship for the Caribbean, in partnership with ISTIC. Another example is a centre which uses Synchrotron-light for Experimental Science and Applications in the Middle East (SESAME). Most of the eight members of SESAME are developing economies: Bahrain, Cyprus, Egypt, Iran, Israel, Jordan, Pakistan, the Palestinian Authority and Turkey. The SESAME centre is being officially inaugurated in May 2017. Iran hosts several international research centres, including the following, which function under the auspices of United Nations bodies: the Regional Centre for Science Park and Technology Incubator Development (UNESCO, est. 2010), the International Centre on Nanotechnology (UNIDO, est. 2012) and the Regional Educational and Research Centre for Oceanography for Western Asia (UNESCO, est. 2014).

Security alliance
Peace and security responsibilities are also on the top of the agenda for cooperation. During the 2009 Africa-South America Summit, Colonel Gaddafi proposed a defence alliance between South America and Africa. He called the alliance "a Nato of the South."  This type of alliance aims to act as an alternative to the Security Council none of whose permanent members is from the two continents.

Political unity
Another area that some of the leaders intend to see big developments in is in the political arena. This is to say that cooperation will give the continents more political power when it comes to the global arena. Some leaders hope that the cooperation will offer greater freedom in choosing a political system. For example, Hugo Chávez hoped to use South–South cooperation as a stage on which to get his message of what he called "21st Century Socialism" across.

Critique
The most apparent critique is that there are just a few voices being heard. These voices are often from the comparatively rich and powerful states of the south (e.g. Brazil, India, South Africa and Venezuela).

Sources

See also

Global South Development Magazine
Developing countries
Fair trade
Group of 77
Least Developed Countries
Non-Aligned Movement
North-South divide
Protocol on Trade Negotiations
Second Africa-South America Summit
South Centre (organization)
UNDP
UNIDO
South-South cooperation in science
South-South Galaxy (http://www.southsouth-galaxy.org/)

References

External links
Global South Development Magazine
 The Sino-Brazilian Principles in a Latin American and BRICS Context: The Case for Comparative Public Budgeting Legal Research Wisconsin International Law Journal, 13 May 2015
The South–South Opportunity
ASA. Página oficial – Official Site 
United Nations Unit for South–South Cooperation
UNEP South–South Cooperation Exchange Mechanism
IPS News – South–South cooperation
Task Team on South–South cooperation
South–South Voices
FAO – Special Programme for Food Security
Southern Innovator
Southern Innovator Magazine Issue 1
Southern Innovator Magazine Issue 2
Southern Innovator Magazine Issue 3
Southern Innovator Magazine Issue 4
Southern Innovator Magazine Issue 5
Making It Magazine South–South solutions issue
– South-South Galaxy

International development
Economic geography